Pößnitz may refer to:

Pößnitz (river), of Brandenburg, Germany
Pesnica (river) (German name Pößnitz), of Styria, Austria and Styria, Slovenia
Posucice (German name Pößnitz), a village in south-western Poland
Pößnitz, a Katastralgemeinde of the municipality Leutschach an der Weinstraße, Styria, Austria